William Morgan (16 December 1896 – 1993) was an English professional footballer who played as a wing half.

References

1896 births
1993 deaths
Footballers from Burnley
English footballers
Association football wing halves
Burnley F.C. players
English Football League players
Date of death missing